Nagarvadhu or Nagar Vadhu (Devanagari: नगरवधू) ("bride of the city") was a tradition followed in some parts of ancient India.

Women competed to win the title of a Nagarvadhu, and there was no taboo against the practice. The most beautiful woman, and most talented in various dance forms, was chosen as the Nagarvadhu.

A Nagarvadhu was respected, and she was a courtesan; people could watch her dance and sing. A Nagarvadhu's price for a single night's dance was very high, and she was only within the reach of the very rich – the king, the princes, and the lords.

Famous Nagarvadhus
Amrapali, state courtesan and Buddhist disciple, described in Vaishali Ki Nagarvadhu by Acharya Chatursen
Vasantasena, a character in the classic Sanskrit story of Mricchakatika, written in the 2nd century BC by Śūdraka
Madhavi, a character in the classic Tamil story of Silappatikaram, written by Ilango Adigal

See also
Devadasi
Deuki
 Ca trù, a similar profession in Vietnam
 Tayū, a similar profession in Japan
 Geisha, a similar profession in Japan
 Kisaeng, a similar profession in Korea
 Tawaif, a similar profession in Mughal India
 Yiji, a similar profession in China

References

Ancient Indian women
 Nagarvadhu
Courtesans by type
Ancient singers
Ancient dancers